The word Rheinpfeil was used to name a number of express trains that ran in Germany between the 1950s and 1991.  For much of that period, a train carrying the name Rheinpfeil also linked Germany with at least one neighbouring country.

Rheinpfeil is a German word meaning "Rhine arrow", and alludes to the Rhine valley, which always formed part of the route of the train carrying that name.

During its time as a Trans Europe Express (TEE), the Rheinpfeil'''s formation (consist) included a "vista-dome car", a rarity on European railways. Seating in the dome car was unreserved. As Eurocity, nr 8/9, conveyed two through DB 2 class carriages Hannover-Koln-Basel-Bern-Lotschberg Bergstrecke-Brig-Milano Porta Garibaldi-Florence-Rome, in summer 1990/1991, conveyed in EXP 324/5 Rome-Milan-Brig-Basel

Route
The core of the Rheinpfeil'''s route was the West Rhine Railway, a  section of line through the Rhine valley:
 Köln Hbf – Bonn Hbf – Koblenz Hbf – Mainz Hbf
The train continued southeast via Frankfurt Hbf and Wurzburg Hbf to Munich until its route was changed in 1979 to run via Mannheim Hbf and Karlsruhe Hbf towards Switzerland.
However, the northern and southern termini of the train, varied a great deal over the years.

See also

 History of rail transport in the Netherlands
 History of rail transport in Germany
 History of rail transport in Switzerland
 List of named passenger trains of Europe

References

Notes

Bibliography

External links

EuroCity
Named passenger trains of Germany
Named passenger trains of Switzerland
Trans Europ Express
Railway services introduced in 1952
Railway services discontinued in 1991